The Magenta class consisted of two broadside ironclads built for the French Navy in the early 1860s. They were the only ironclad two-deckers ever built, and the first ironclads to feature a naval ram.

Design and description
The Magenta class was designed by naval architect Henri Dupuy de Lôme as a reply to the low height of the 's gun ports which impaired their ability to work their guns in heavy seas. He gave the Magentas an upper spar deck which would allow them to work those guns in all weathers and caused them to be rated as ironclad ships of the line by the French Navy. They were considered to be good seaboats, although they were not very maneuverable.

Magenta displaced  while Solférino displaced . They were equipped with a metal-reinforced, spur-shaped ram. The ironclads had a crew of 674 officers and enlisted men.

The Magenta-class ships had a single two-cylinder horizontal-return connecting-rod compound steam engine that drove the propeller shaft, using steam provided by eight boilers.

Armament and protection
The main battery of the Magenta class consisted of sixteen  Modèle 1858–60 smoothbore muzzle-loading guns, thirty-four  Modèle 1858–60 rifled muzzle-loading (RML) guns and a pair of  RML howitzers on two gun decks. All of the 194 mm guns and ten of the 164.7 mm guns were mounted on the lower gun deck on the broadside. The remaining 164.7 mm guns and the 225 mm howitzers were positioned on the upper gun deck; the former on the broadside, but the latter were placed on pivot mounts as chase guns fore and aft. In the late 1860s all of the guns on the lower gun deck were removed and their armament was changed to four  RMLs and eight 194 mm smoothbores, two each of the latter fore and aft as chase guns on the upper gun deck. Their final armament consisted of ten 240 mm Modèle 1864–66 guns and four 194 mm guns as chase guns fore and aft.

Ships

Notes

Citations

Bibliography

External links 

 Plan of the hull
 Cargo bay and machinery
 2nd battery and castle
 1st battery
 Riggings

Ironclad classes
 
Ships built in France
Ship classes of the French Navy